Randolph Jenkins (5 September 1925 - July 1978) was an Irish professional footballer. He made 20 appearances in the Football League for Gillingham and Northampton Town.

References

1925 births
Association footballers from County Sligo
Republic of Ireland association footballers
Northampton Town F.C. players
Gillingham F.C. players
Fulham F.C. players
Walsall F.C. players
1978 deaths
Association footballers not categorized by position